"Onkalo" is a maxi single released by the J-pop singer Eiko Shimamiya (ETB-0161). Released 21 June 2012, it is her first single after her retirement from I've Sound in April 2011. The single features two new songs; Onkalo and Unison.

Track listing
"Onkalo"
"Unison"
"Onkalo"（Instrumental version）

References

2012 singles
Eiko Shimamiya songs
2012 songs